"The Charleston" is a jazz composition that was written to accompany the Charleston dance. It was composed in 1923, with lyrics by Cecil Mack and music by James P. Johnson, a composer and early leader of the stride piano school of jazz piano.

The song was featured in the American black Broadway musical comedy show Runnin' Wild, which had its premiere at the New Colonial Theatre in New York on October 29, 1923. The music of the dockworkers from South Carolina inspired Johnson to compose the music. The dance known as the Charleston came to characterize the times. Lyrics, though rarely sung (an exception is Chubby Checker's 1961 recording), were penned by Cecil Mack, himself one of the most accomplished songwriters of the early 1900s. The song's driving rhythm, basically the first bar of a 3 2 clave, came to have widespread use in jazz comping and musicians still reference it by name. Harmonically, the song features a five-chord ragtime progression (I-III7-VI7-II7-V7-I).

The Charleston entered the public domain in the United States in 2019.

In popular culture 
The song has been used in a number of films set in the 1920s. Ginger Rogers dances to the music in the film Roxie Hart (1942). In the movies Margie (1946) and It's a Wonderful Life (1946), the song is played during school dance scenes. In the movie Tea for Two (1950), with Doris Day and Gordon MacRae, the song is a featured production number. A version performed by Enoch Light and the Charleston City All Stars is used in Woody Allen's 2011 film Midnight in Paris, which largely takes place in the 1920s. The track "Bang Bang" from the 2013 film The Great Gatsby, performed by Will.I.Am, samples the song.

One of the most famous recordings of the song was by The Golden Gate Orchestra in 1925, which has been inducted into the National Recording Registry.

See also
List of 1920s jazz standards

Footnotes

1923 songs
Jazz songs
Songs with lyrics by Cecil Mack
Songs with music by James P. Johnson
1920s jazz standards
Songs about dancing
Songs about South Carolina
United States National Recording Registry recordings